Joseph Hirkala (November 16, 1923 – January 1, 1987) was an American Democratic Party politician who served in the New Jersey State Senate from 1972 until 1987. 

Hirkala was born in Passaic, New Jersey and attended Drake Business School.  He served in the U.S. Navy during World War II.  He was employed by the City of Passaic, as the Assistant Tax Assessor, Registrar of Vital Statistics, Supervisor of Local Public Records, and for many years as the City Clerk.  He was elected to the New Jersey General Assembly in 1967 and re-elected in 1969.  He was elected State Senator in 1971, and re-elected in 1973, 1977, 1981, and 1983.  He died in office.  During his 26 years in the Senate, he served as Assistant Minority Leader, Majority Whip, Assistant Majority leader and President Pro Tempore.

References

1923 births
1987 deaths
Democratic Party New Jersey state senators
United States Navy personnel of World War II
Democratic Party members of the New Jersey General Assembly
Politicians from Passaic, New Jersey
20th-century American politicians